Park Ji-min may refer to:

 Jimin, birth name Park Ji-min, a South Korean singer, dancer, and member of the boy band BTS
 Park Ji-min (singer, born 1997), a South Korean singer and former member of the vocal duo 15&
 Park Ji-min (footballer), a  South Korean footballer currently playing as a goalkeeper for Suwon Bluewings